Gour may refer to:

 Hari Singh Gour (1870-1949), Indian lawyer, educator, and writer
 Joseph-Omer Gour (1893-1959), Canadian politician
 Rimstone, a cave formation
 Gauḍa (city), a medieval Indian city
 Gour, a place in Malda district, West Bengal, India
 Gaur Brahmins, an Indian caste of Brahmins or landlords
 Garha, an Indian caste of Muslims
 Gour Kingdom, an ancient kingdom based in Sylhet, Bangladesh
Gour Govinda (r. 1260-1303), the final ruler of Gour

See also
 Gauda (disambiguation)
 Gaur
 Ghor Province, one of the thirty-four provinces of Afghanistan